Ramla Left Battery, also known as Belancourt Battery or Xagħra Battery, was an artillery battery in Ramla Bay, limits of Xagħra on the island of Gozo, Malta. It was built by the Order of Saint John in 1715–1716 as one of a series of coastal fortifications around the Maltese Islands. The battery now lies in ruins.

History

Ramla Left Battery was built in 1715–1716 as part of the first building programme of coastal batteries in Malta. It was one of several fortifications in Ramla Bay that also included Ramla Right Battery on the opposite side of the bay and Ramla Redoubt in the centre. These were all linked together by an entrenchment wall. Ramla Bay was further defended by Marsalforn Tower on the plateau above the bay, and an underwater barrier to prevent enemy ships from landing within the bay.

The battery originally had an irregularly shaped gun platform with a parapet having six embrasures. A small blockhouse was located at the rear of the battery. Construction cost around 295 scudi.

The battery saw use during the French invasion of Malta in 1798, when it fired on the approaching French fleet.

Present day
Today, all that remains of the battery are some ruins. These ruins, along with the rest of Ramla Bay, are managed by the Gaia Foundation.

At least one iron cannon from the battery is now located at the Cittadella.

References

External links
National Inventory of the Cultural Property of the Maltese Islands

Batteries in Malta
Hospitaller fortifications in Malta
Military installations established in 1715
Ruins in Malta
Xagħra
Limestone buildings in Malta
National Inventory of the Cultural Property of the Maltese Islands
18th-century fortifications
1715 establishments in Malta
18th Century military history of Malta